Risto Dufva (born May 1, 1963) is a Finnish former professional ice hockey goaltender. He is currently the head coach of Vaasan Sport of the Finnish ice hockey league (Liiga).

Dufva played with JYP Jyväskylä during the 1990–91 SM-liiga season.

Dufva took over the position of head coach for Lukko with the start of the 2012–13 SM-liiga season. Dufva later went on to coach Mikkelin Jukurit until resigning from the team. 
After a disappointing first half to the 18/19 season, JYP decided to hire Dufva as their new coach. He was hired as the head coach of Vaasan Sport of the Finnish ice hockey league (Liiga) during the 2019-20 season.

References

External links

1963 births
Living people
Finnish ice hockey coaches
Finnish ice hockey goaltenders
JYP Jyväskylä players
Sportspeople from Jyväskylä
20th-century Finnish people